= Institute of Geological Sciences =

Institute of Geological Sciences may refer to

- British Geological Survey
- Institute of Geological Sciences of the National Academy of Sciences of Ukraine, a research institute of the National Academy of Sciences of Ukraine
